Zhao Jun (Chinese: 赵均; born 19 October 1988 in Liaoning) is a Chinese football player.

Club career
In 2009, Zhao Jun started his professional footballer career with Beijing Baxy in the China League Two.

In February 2014, Zhao moved to Chinese Super League side Guizhou Renhe on a free transfer.  On 22 April 2014, Zhao made his debut for Guizhou Renhe in the 2014 AFC Champions League against Western Sydney Wanderers, coming on as a substitute for Guo Sheng in the 82nd minute.

Club career statistics 
Statistics accurate as of match played 13 October 2018

References

1988 births
Living people
Chinese footballers
Footballers from Dalian
Beijing Sport University F.C. players
Beijing Renhe F.C. players
Chinese Super League players
China League One players
Association football midfielders